The Counter-terrorism Rapid Response (Italian: Antiterrorismo Pronto Impiego, or ATPI), formed in 1983, is a special police unit of Italy's Guardia di Finanza. It is tasked with counter-terrorism operations and the protection of VIPs and places of interest in the country. The ATPI has also participated in operations in Albania, Kosovo, and Hungary.

History 

The ATPI was founded in 1983 during Italy's Years of Lead. It is the special-operations component of the Guardia di Finanza. The force's predecessor was the SVATPI (Scorta Antiterrorismo Pronto Impiego), formed in 1977 to combat robberies by the Red Brigades of the Bank of Italy's armored cars. The SVATPI also escorted prominent individuals, including the Minister of Finance, to prevent kidnapping.

Mission 

The unit specializes in counter-terrorism activity, supervising airports, ports, and other sensitive targets. It also combats illicit trafficking, focusing on organized crime, drug and weapons smuggling, and illegal immigration. The ATPI also supports the operations of local and regional governments, deploying teams of marksmen during drug-seizure operations or tactical units for high-risk tasks, and can act as riot units in a serious threat to the public order. The ATPI is the escort service for the Minister of Economy and Finance. The unit is trained in the liberation of hostages, and has operated in missions abroad.

Organization 

The ATPI is divided into 10-person operating teams, headed by a marshal.

Training 
Guardia di Finanza soldiers qualify for the ATPI after passing a course. The 10-week training course, which is physically and psychologically demanding, is held at the Guardia di Finanza barracks in Orvieto. The course includes training in police techniques necessary to combat public-order crime, escorting, police administration, and marksmanship with firearms such as Beretta 92 pistols, Beretta PM12 submachine guns, Franchi SPAS-12 shotguns, and Beretta AR70/90 assault rifles. Techniques taught are:
 Personal defense and martial arts
 Police and dynamic shooting
 Burglary and hostage release
 Safety stock maintenance
 Fast and armored-car driving 
 Guerrilla and anti-guerrilla techniques
 Police techniques

Weapons 

Each ATPI officer carries a Beretta 92FS pistol. Each team has: 
 a Beretta M12S machine gun with a 32-round 9 mm Parabellum magazine
 two Beretta AR70/90 assault rifles with 5.56×45mm NATO cartridges
 a Franchi SPAS-15 combat shotgun of 12/70 mm caliber. It can be armed with non-lethal ammunition (rubber bullets).
Units also have several H & K MP5 machine guns. These can be loaded for  narrow spaces (such as an aircraft), where hostages can be raised. The Mauser SP86 and Heckler & Koch PSG-1 are among sniper rifles used by the force.

Vehicles 

Vehicles in ATPI service are identical to those of the Guardia di Finanza. They include the Alfa Romeo 156, Alfa Romeo 159, Fiat Punto, Fiat Bravo, Iveco Daily, Mitsubishi Pajero, and the Subaru Forester armored vehicle.

Known domestic missions 

 June–October 1988, Reggio Calabria, Operation Vespri Siciliani: ATPI officers from all departments in the area were activated as part of a broader strategy to consolidate state presence in Sicily in the aftermath of an attack which killed a judge and several others.
 1992, Bari: 25 officers from the 3rd ATPI Napoli Company supported territorial departments in an anti-smuggling operation ordered by Finance Minister Rino Formica.
 1987–1994: four ATPI officers from the 3rd Napoli Company were used in Rome to protect the President of the Constitutional Court.
 February–June 1994, Villa Literno, Caserta: 25 ATPI officers from the 3rd Como company, based in Lavena Ponte Tresa, and five from the 4th Rome Company participated in anti-smuggling activities and prevention of illegal immigration. They were subsequently deployed during the 20th G7 summit in Naples as escorts for foreign delegations and for counter-terrorism activities.
 1996–1999, Milan, Operation Milano-Massima Sicurezza: anti-immigration and anti-smuggling activities
 2000–2002, Apulia, Operation Spring: anti-smuggling activities
 20–22 July 2001, Genoa: security during the 27th G8 summit
 2003 Naples: law enforcement
 8–10 July 2009, L'Aquila: security during the 35th G8 summit; two ATPI officers were included in the escort of American president Barack Obama.
 26–27 May 2017, Taormina: security during the 43rd G7 summit

Foreign operations 

The ATPI has been used in Albania to protect members of the Guardia di Finanza who were deployed in the CAM-SEA mission. The unit was assigned to Prime Minister Giuliano Amato, and to the Italian contingent in Kosovo.

See also
Law enforcement in Italy

References 

Counterterrorist organizations
Guardia di Finanza
Police tactical units